Cueva de los Guácharos National Natural Park is the oldest national park in Colombia. The caves formed from the karstic zones of the Magdalena and Caquetá rivers.

The park is intended to protect the cloud forest and páramo ecosystems.  This area hosts one of the last intact oak forests in the country, with the native oak species Quercus humboldtii (Bonpl.) and Trigonobalanus excelsa (Lozano, 1979)).

Biodiversity 

In 2005, the National Natural Parks System identified 296 registered species of birds in the park. Further recorded species are:

References 

Biosphere reserves of Colombia
National parks of Colombia
Geography of Huila Department
Geography of Caquetá Department
Tourist attractions in Huila Department
Tourist attractions in Caquetá Department
1960 establishments in Colombia
Protected areas established in 1960